The Concentratin' Kid is a 1930 American Western film directed by Arthur Rosson and written by Harold Tarshis. The film stars Hoot Gibson, Kathryn Crawford, Duke R. Lee, Jim Mason and Robert Homans. The film was released on October 26, 1930, by Universal Pictures.

Cast 
Hoot Gibson as Concentratin' Kid
Kathryn Crawford as Betty Lou Vaughn
Duke R. Lee as Boss Blaine
Jim Mason as Art Campbell
Robert Homans as C.C. Stile

References

External links 
 

1930 films
American Western (genre) films
1930 Western (genre) films
Universal Pictures films
Films directed by Arthur Rosson
American black-and-white films
1930s English-language films
1930s American films